William Burgin may refer to:
William O. Burgin (1877–1946), U.S. Representative from North Carolina
William G. Burgin, Mississippi state senator convicted of conspiracy to defraud the United States